Chechar  is a town and commune in Khenchela Province, Algeria. According to the 2008 census it has a population of 27,428.

References

Communes of Khenchela Province